Nebraska Highway 13 is a highway in the northeastern part of the U.S. state of Nebraska that runs predominantly northwest-southeast with a south terminus east of Hadar at an intersection with U.S. Highway 81 and a north terminus two miles (3 km) south of Center, Nebraska at an intersection with Nebraska Highway 84.

Route description
Nebraska Highway 13 begins at U.S. Highway 81 north of Norfolk. It goes west through farmland into Hadar, then turns northwest through Pierce and Foster.  At Plainview, NE 13 meets U.S. Highway 20 and the two highways overlap going west from Plainview.  After , NE 13 turns northward and meets Nebraska Highway 59 at Creighton.  It continues northward and ends south of Center at an intersection with Nebraska Highway 84.

Major intersections

References

External links

The Nebraska Highways Page: Highways 1 to 30
Nebraska Roads: NE 11-20

013
Transportation in Pierce County, Nebraska
Transportation in Antelope County, Nebraska
Transportation in Knox County, Nebraska